Sweatsuit is a compilation album by American rapper Nelly, released on November 22, 2005. The album consists of tracks from his 2004 simultaneous album releases, Sweat and Suit. The US edition of the compilation also includes four extra tracks, including the single "Grillz" featuring rappers Paul Wall and Ali & Gipp, which reached number one on the Billboard Hot 100 chart; along with The Notorious B.I.G. single "Nasty Girl", "Tired" featuring Avery Storm, and "Fly Away" from the soundtrack of the 2005 film The Longest Yard.

Sweatsuit received positive reviews from critics, for containing the highlights from both Sweat and Suit, praising its material quality. Commercially, the compilation peaked at 26 on the US Billboard 200, and reached the top 40 in Australia and New Zealand. It has been certified gold by the Recording Industry Association of America (RIAA), for shipments of 500,000 copies.

Background
While recording material for his third studio album, Nelly originally had the intention of producing one album. Songs were being recorded at a steady pace, with Nelly composing more ideas, to which he established the idea of two albums released simultaneously to house all the tracks. On April 27, 2004, Nelly's representative initially described the upcoming albums as thematically dissimilar, "one is more melodic and party-oriented in the vein of records like "E.I." and "Tip Drill", while the other was described as having a "harder edge". Nelly would release singles accompanied by music videos from both albums. Talking to MTV News, Nelly went on to describe the differences between both albums; their titles of Sweat and Suit were announced on May 27, 2004. He noted Sweat as "more up-tempo" and "energetic", while characterizing Suit as more of "a grown-up and sexy vibe [...] it's more melodic".

Release
On the same year, the compilation was released in the US on November 22, 2005 and in the UK on May 16.

Reception

Critical
AllMusic's Jason Birchmeier saw Sweatsuit as an album that combines the highlights of Sweat and Suit, and one that should have been released initially. Birchmeier went on to criticize the compilation's track sequencing, and described the new songs as "unexceptional." Though he summarized its material as "a solid, well-balanced, smoothly mixed listen," awarding the compilation four out of five stars. RapReviews.com's Steve Juon gave Sweatsuit an eight out of ten. Juon didn't see the new tracks as reason to purchase the compilation; he saw it as discarding material not targeted towards a pop audience, to make the compilation more attractive to new buyers who didn't get either Sweat or Suit. Ultimately, Juon went on to praise Nelly's consistency, confidence and the combination of pop and hip hop within the material.

Commercial
Sweatsuit peaked at number 26 on the US Billboard 200 chart, remaining on the chart for twenty-four weeks. The compilation peaked at number 6 and 5 on the Top R&B/Hip-Hop Albums and Top Rap Albums, respectively. It was certified gold by the Recording Industry Association of America (RIAA), for shipments of 500,000 copies. On the Australian Albums Chart, Sweatsuit debuted at number 25, peaking at number 24 on the following week. It remained on the chart for ten weeks before dropping out on the week of August 21, 2005. The compilation peaked at number 36 on the New Zealand Albums Chart, dropping off on the following week. On the UK Albums Chart, it peaked at number 41. It was certified silver by the British Phonographic Industry (BPI).

Track listing

Notes
"My Place" contains a portion of composition from "Isn't It a Shame" by girl group Labelle and Randy DeBarge's 1982 "I Like It". It samples elements of The Del-Vikings' 1957 "Come Go with Me".
"Heart of a Champion" samples John Tesh' 1990 "Roundball Rock".
"Na-NaNa-Na" samples Tupac Shakur's 1996 "2 of Amerikaz Most Wanted".
"Playa" samples Lee Ryda's  1987 "Magnetic Dance 2".
"'N' Dey Say" samples Spandau Ballet’s 1983 "True".
"Grillz" contains interpolations of Destiny's Child's 2004 "Soldier" and MC Shan's 1987 "Left Me Lonely".

Personnel
Credits adapted from Allmusic.

Victor Abijaudi – engineer
The Alchemist – audio production, producer
Ali – featured artist, main personnel, rap
Ali & Gipp – performer, primary artist
Kori Anders – mixing
Avery Storm – featured artist, guest artist, main personnel, primary artist, vocals
Big Gipp – guest artist
Biggie – featured artist
Mr. Leslie Braithwaite – mixing
Matt Brauss – brass
Jayson Bridges – audio production, drums, percussion, producer
Sandy Brummels – art direction
Al Byno – engineer
Jasper Cameron – featured artist, main personnel, producer, vocals
Chris Carmouche – engineer
Jason Carson – engineer
Andrew Coleman – engineer
Diddy – featured artist, main personnel, primary artist, rap
Phillip Duckett – producer
Jermaine Dupri – audio production, mixing, producer
Missy Elliott – featured artist, guest artist, main personnel, primary artist, rap
Brian Frye – engineer
Richard "Rip" Gager – guitar
Chris Gehringer – mastering
Gipp – featured artist, main personnel, rap
Harold Guy – assistant engineer
Anthony Hamilton – featured artist, guest artist, main personnel, primary artist, vocals
James D. "Sted Fast" II Hargrove – guitar, producer
Jennifer Havey – A&R
John Horesco IV – engineer, mixing
Jun Ishizeki – engineer
Ronald Isley – featured artist, guest artist, primary artist
Jagged Edge – featured artist, guest artist, main personnel, primary artist, rap
Jaheim – featured artist, main personnel, vocals
King James II – engineer

Jazze Pha – audio production, featured artist, guest artist, main personnel, primary artist, producer, rap
Kim Moore Johnson – vocals (background)
Rajinder Kala – congas
Chip Karpells – engineer, mixing
Debra Killings – bass
Kevin Law – A&R, engineer
Marc Stephen Lee – engineer
Murphy Lee – featured artist, main personnel, primary artist, vocals
Lincoln University Vocal Ensemble – featured artist, main personnel, vocals
Bryan Loss – drums
Lunatics – featured artist
Stephen Marley – featured artist, main personnel, primary artist, vocals
Dan "Thunda Dan" Marshal – engineer, guitar
Brandon "B Don" Matthews – engineer
NDoffene MBodji – assistant engineer
Tim McGraw – featured artist, guest artist, main personnel, primary artist, vocals
Tadd Mingo – assistant engineer, engineer
Mobb Deep – featured artist, guest artist, main personnel, primary artist, rap
Carl Nappa – engineer
Nelly – main personnel, primary artist, vocals
The Neptunes – audio production, producer
Jared Nugent – assistant engineer
Shorty B. – bass, guitar
Snoop Dogg – featured artist, main personnel, primary artist, rap
Nico Solis – engineer
Joe Spiz – art direction, design
St. Lunatics – main personnel, primary artist, vocals
T.I. – featured artist, guest artist, main personnel, primary artist, vocals
Phil Tan – mixing
Richard Travali – mixing
Serge Tsai – engineer
Paul Wall – featured artist, guest artist, main personnel, primary artist, rap
Bruce Waynne – producer
James White – photography
Pharrell Williams – featured artist, guest artist, main personnel, primary artist, vocals

Charts

Weekly charts

Year-end charts

Certifications

References

External links
 Sweatsuit at Discogs (list of releases)

2005 compilation albums
Nelly albums
Albums produced by the Neptunes
Albums produced by Jermaine Dupri
Universal Records compilation albums